Gigny-Bussy is a commune in the Marne department in north-eastern France. The commune was formed by the merger of the former communes Gigny-aux-Bois and Bussy-aux-Bois in 1966.

See also
Communes of the Marne department

References

Gignybussy